Rajinder Singh Chib (born 1942, also known as R.S. Chib) is a former Indian Air Force officer turned politician from Jammu and Kashmir and member of Democratic Progressive Azad Party. Chib served as Health Minister in the Jammu and Kashmir cabinet from 1987 to 1990.  On 3 October 2022, Chib was appointed as General Secretary for Democratic Azad Party.

Political career
R.S. Chib started his political career with the Jammu and Kashmir National Conference and served as Health Minister in the Jammu and Kashmir cabinet from 1987 to 1990. He quit from his posts and joined the Janata Dal when V. P. Singh was the Prime Minister of India. After the Janata Dal's dissolution in 1999, Chib joined the Bhartiya Janata Party.

In 2002, Chib fought the Jammu and Kashmir Legislative Assembly elections from the Suchetgarh Assembly constituency but lost. He later joined the Indian National Congress. He has also served as General Secretary for the Jammu and Kashmir Pradesh Congress Committee.

After Ghulam Nabi Azad resigned from the Indian National Congress in August 2022, Chib was among the former ministers who resigned in support of Azad. He became a member of the Democratic Azad Party.

On 3 October 2022, R.S. Chib was appointed as General Secretary for Democratic Azad Party.

Personal life
Chib was born in Watala Bhimber (now in Pakistan Administered Kashmir). He pursued B.E. degree from Birla Institute of Technology and Science, Pilani and his post graduation from Indian Institute of Science. He also got fellowship in Institution of Electronics and Telecommunication Engineers. He served as an honorary professor in Rajouri's Baba Ghulam Shah Badshah University.

References

Living people
Jammu and Kashmir MLAs 1987–1996
Former members of Indian National Congress
1942 births